The Roman Catholic Archdiocese of Kumasi is the Metropolitan See for the Ecclesiastical province of Kumasi in Ghana.

History
 1932.02.02: Established as Apostolic Vicariate of Kumasi from the Apostolic Vicariate of Gold Coast
 1950.04.18: Promoted as Diocese of Kumasi
 2002.01.17: Promoted as Metropolitan Archdiocese of Kumasi

Special churches
The seat of the archbishop and minor basilica is St. Peter’s Cathedral Basilica in Kumasi.

Bishops
 Vicar Apostolic of Kumasi (Roman rite) 
 Bishop Hubert Joseph Paulissen, S.M.A. (1932.11.29 – 1950.04.18); see below
 Bishops of Kumasi (Roman rite)
 Bishop Hubert Joseph Paulissen, S.M.A. (1950.04.18 – 1952); see above
 Bishop André van den Bronk, S.M.A. (1952.05.15 – 1962.02.13), appointed Prefect of Parakou, Benin
 Bishop Joseph Amihere Essuah (1962.02.24 – 1969.11.20), appointed Bishop of Sekondi-Takoradi
 Bishop Peter Kwasi Sarpong (1969.11.20 – 2002.01.17); see below
 Metropolitan Archbishops of Kumasi (Roman rite)
 Archbishop Peter Kwasi Sarpong (2002.01.17 – 2008.03.26); see above
 Archbishop Thomas Kwaku Mensah (2008.03.26 – 2012.05.15)
 Archbishop Gabriel Justice Yaw Anokye (since 2012.05.15)

Auxiliary Bishop
Gabriel Justice Yaw Anokye (2003-2008), appointed Bishop of Obuasi; later returned here as Archbishop

Other priest of this diocese who became bishop
John Yaw Afoakwa, appointed Bishop of Obuasi in 2013

Suffragan Dioceses
 Goaso
 Konongo–Mampong
 Obuasi
 Sunyani
 Techiman

See also
 Roman Catholicism in Ghana

References

Sources
 GCatholic.org
 Website of Catholic Archdiocese Kumasi

Kumasi
Kumasi
A